SkyEurope served the following destinations as of March 2009. In addition to scheduled flights SkyEurope operated charter flights from Bratislava and Prague. On 1 September 2009, SkyEurope ceased operations due to ongoing debts.

Europe

 Albania
Tirana International Airport Charter
 Austria
Vienna International Airport Base
 Belgium
Brussels Airport
 Bulgaria
Burgas Airport [summer seasonal]
Sofia Airport
 Croatia
Dubrovnik Airport [summer seasonal]
Split - Kaštela/Resnik Airport [summer seasonal]
Zadar Airport [summer seasonal]
 Cyprus
Larnaca International Airport
 Czech Republic
Prague - Ruzyně Airport Base
 Denmark
Copenhagen - Kastrup Airport
 France
Nice Côte d'Azur Airport
Paris-Orly Airport
 Greece
Athens - Elefthérios Venizélos Airport
Thessaloniki - Macedonia Airport
 Italy
Bari - Bari Airport
Bergamo - Il Caravaggio International Airport
Catania-Fontanarossa Airport [summer seasonal]
Naples - Ugo Niutta Airport
Olbia - Olbia - Costa Smeralda Airport [summer seasonal]
Rome - Leonardo da Vinci-Fiumicino Airport
Venice - Treviso Airport
 Netherlands
Amsterdam Airport Schiphol
 Portugal
Lisbon Portela Airport
 Romania
Bucharest - Aurel Vlaicu International Airport
 Slovakia
Bratislava - M. R. Štefánik Airport Base
Košice International Airport
Poprad-Tatry Airport
 Spain
Alicante - El Altet Airport [summer seasonal]
Barcelona - El Prat Airport
Málaga - Pablo Ruiz Picasso Airport [summer seasonal]
 Turkey
Istanbul - Istanbul Sabiha Gökçen International Airport
 United Kingdom
London Luton Airport
Manchester - Manchester Airport

References

Lists of airline destinations